Alys is a Welsh language television series which began airing in early 2011 on S4C. The first series commenced on 23 January 2011 and consisted of eight episodes. The series rated well for S4C and a second series was produced in early 2012 and began airing on 11 November 2012. Series two consisted of a further eight episodes. , the programme has not been renewed for a third series. 

Note: The text highlighted in bold are subsidiary titles given for each episode.

Series overview

Series 1 (2011)

Series 2 (2012)

Ratings

References

External links

Alys